Choseley is a tiny hamlet and civil parish in the English county of Norfolk.

The villages name means 'Gravelly wood/clearing'.

At the 2011 Census the population remained less than 100. For the purposes of local government, the parish falls within the district of King's Lynn and West Norfolk.

Notes

External links
.
Information from Genuki Norfolk on Choseley.

 

Hamlets in Norfolk
King's Lynn and West Norfolk
Civil parishes in Norfolk